Roost may refer to:

Animal resting
 Roosting, resting behavior of birds
 Communal roosting, a behavior of some birds and other animals
 Monarch butterfly roosts, communal resting sites in monarch butterfly migration
 Bat roost, a list of places where bats roost

Other uses
 Roost Records, an American jazz record label
 Roost Books, an imprint of Shambhala Publications
 Roost Shared Storage, an American self-storage company acquired by the Australian company Spacer
 The Roost, a 2005 American horror film
 The Roost (podcast network), a division of Rooster Teeth Productions
 The Roost (Washington), a mountain in Washington state, US

See also
 Jan Van der Roost (born 1956), Belgian composer
 Roost-Warendin, France
 Roest, a surname
 Rost, a surname